The 2022 FIA World Rally Championship-2 was the tenth season of the World Rally Championship-2, an auto racing championship for rally cars that is recognised by the Fédération Internationale de l'Automobile as the second-highest tier of international rallying. The category was open to cars entered by teams and complying with Group Rally2. The championship began in January 2022 with the Rallye Monte-Carlo and concluded in November 2022 with Rally Japan, and ran in support of the 2022 World Rally Championship.

Andreas Mikkelsen and Torstein Eriksen were the defending 2021 drivers' and co-drivers' champions. Movisport were the defending teams' champions.

Emil Lindholm and Reeta Hämäläinen became 2022 WRC-2 drivers' and co-drivers' champions, while Toksport WRT won the teams' championship.

Calendar

Entries
The following teams and crews are officially entered into the 2022 World Rally Championship-2:

Regulation changes

Sporting Regulations
The following titles will be contested within the WRC-2 category in 2022:
Open Championship for Drivers
Open Championship for Co-Drivers
Championship for Teams
Junior Championship for Drivers
Junior Championship for Co-Drivers
Masters Cup for Drivers
Masters Cup for Co-Drivers

In a change to 2021 rules, drivers can enter the Open and Junior championships independently instead of having to enter through a team. Teams wishing to compete in the championship for teams must follow the same rules. For WRC2 Junior championships, drivers must have been born on or after 1 January 1992 with no registration necessary. Juniors must not have previously won WRC2 or WRC3 or ever been nominated to score points in the WRC Manufacturers Championship. The Masters Cup will run alongside the open championship for drivers born on or before 1 January 1972 and have registered to compete in the cup.

For the Open and Junior Driver and Co-Driver championships, points will be considered from the best 6 of 7 rounds entered. For Teams and the Masters Cup, points from the best 5 of 6 rallies entered in Europe will count, plus bonus points from a seventh round entered outside Europe.

Results and standings

Season summary

Scoring system
Points are awarded to the top ten classified finishers in each event. Power Stage points are also awarded in the drivers' and co-drivers' championships, with three points awarded to the first place finisher on the stage, two to second place, and one to third. A team has to enter two cars to score points in an event. Drivers and teams must nominate a scoring rally when they enter the event and the best six scores from seven nominated rallies will count towards the final classification. Registered drivers are able to enter additional rallies with Priority 2 status without scoring points.

FIA Open World Rally Championship-2 for Drivers

FIA Open World Rally Championship-2 for Co-Drivers

FIA World Rally Championship-2 for Teams

FIA Junior World Rally Championship-2 for Drivers

FIA Junior World Rally Championship-2 for Co-Drivers

FIA Masters Cup for Drivers

FIA Masters Cup for Co-Drivers

Notes

References

External links
  
 FIA World Rally Championship-2 Open 2022 at eWRC-results.com
 FIA World Rally Championship-2 Junior 2022 at eWRC-results.com
 FIA World Rally Championship-2 Masters Cup 2022 at eWRC-results.com

 
WRC-2